Leviton is an American manufacturer of electrical wiring equipment. Leviton may also refer to
Leviton (quasiparticle), a collective excitation of a single electron within a metal
Michael Leviton, American singer-songwriter and ukulele player